Guilherme de Oliveira Garré (born 20 March 1993 in São Paulo) is a Brazilian footballer. He currently plays for Figueirense.

Honours

Santo André
Campeonato Paulista Série A2: 2016, 2019

Figueirense
Copa Santa Catarina: 2021

References

External links
 Guilherme Garré at playmakerstats.com (English version of ogol.com.br)

1993 births
Living people
Brazilian footballers
Association football midfielders
Esporte Clube Santo André players
Esporte Clube São Bento players
Boa Esporte Clube players
Botafogo Futebol Clube (SP) players
Clube do Remo players
Sociedade Imperatriz de Desportos players
Figueirense FC players
Footballers from São Paulo